Zhang Jin (born 25 November 2000) is a Chinese artistic gymnast. She is a 2018 World bronze medalist and 2018 Asian Games champion in the team event. She is also the 2018 Asian Games bronze medalist on the balance beam and the 2018 Stuttgart World Cup all-around champion. She represented China at the 2020 Summer Olympics.

Early life 
Zhang Jin was born on 25 November 2000 in Shanghai. She began gymnastics when she was four years old.

Junior career 
Zhang competed on the vault and the balance beam at the 2014 Chinese Championships and helped the Shanghai team finish fourth. She made her international debut at the 2015 Austrian Team Open and helped the Chinese team win the gold medal. Then at the 2015 Chinese Championships, she won the silver medal in the team event and finished twenty-second in the all-around final. At the 2015 National Youth Games, Zhang helped her provincial team finish fourth. She then competed at the 2015 Olympic Hopes Cup in Liberec and won the silver medal with the Chinese team and the bronze medal in the all-around.

Senior career

2016 
Zhang made her senior debut at the Olympic Test Event in Rio de Janeiro where she finished seventeenth in the all-around with a total score of 54.316. Then at the Chinese Championships she won the bronze medal in the team event and placed tenth in the all-around. She was not named to China's 2016 Olympic team. In October, she competed at the Chinese Individual Championships but did not advance into any event finals.

2017 
Zhang finished sixth in the all-around at the Stuttgart World Cup. Then at the Chinese Championships, she finished eighth in the all-around. At the National Games, she won the bronze medal with the Shanghai team. Individually, she finished tenth in the all-around, seventh on vault and floor exercise. She finished her season at the Chinese Individual Championships where she won gold on the floor exercise, silver on the vault, and bronze on the balance beam.

2018 
Zhang won the gold medal in the all-around at the Stuttgart World Cup with a total score of 53.431. Then at the Chinese Championships, she won the silver medal in the all-around behind Luo Huan and placed fourth on the balance beam. She was selected to represent China at the 2018 Asian Games alongside Chen Yile, Liu Jinru, Liu Tingting, and Luo Huan, and they won the team gold medal. Then in the balance beam final, she won the bronze medal behind Yile and Kim Su-jong. The same team was then selected to compete at the World Championships. Although Zhang fell on the balance beam, the team won the bronze medal. On her mistake in the team final, she stated, "I am a little bit disappointed. [The] uneven bars were good. We made one mistake but didn't drop too many points. I was not worried about balance beam before the competition because usually we are very good, but it wasn't good." In the balance beam final, she fell twice and finished last with a score of 11.500.

2019 
Zhang helped the Chinese team win the silver medal at the City of Jesolo Trophy. Individually, she finished sixth in the all-around and fourth on the balance beam and floor exercise. Then at the Chinese Championships, she finished ninth in the all-around and seventh on the floor exercise.

2020 
In March, Zhang competed at the American Cup and finished ninth in the all-around. She was scheduled to compete at the Birmingham World Cup, but the event was postponed and eventually canceled due to the COVID-19 pandemic. In September, she competed at the postponed Chinese Championships and finished seventh in the all-around. She ended the season at the Friendship and Solidarity Competition, which was held under strict COVID-19 safety protocols in Tokyo in November. She competed on all four events to help Team Solidarity win gold.

2021 
At the Chinese Championships, Zhang won the silver medal in the all-around behind Lu Yufei and placed fifth on the balance beam and fourth on the floor exercise. She won the gold medals in the all-around at both the 1st and 2nd Chinese Olympic Trials. On 3 July, she was selected to represent China at the 2020 Summer Olympics alongside Lu Yufei, Ou Yushan, and Tang Xijing.

During the qualification round, Zhang competed on all four events to help the Chinese team qualify in third place. Then in the team final, Zhang contributed scores of 14.066 on vault, 13.900 on balance beam, and 13.133 on floor exercise towards the team's seventh-place finish. After the Olympics, she competed at the National Games where she finished fifth in the all-around and fourth on the floor exercise.

2022 
Zhang competed at the 2022 Asian Championships in June.  While there she helped China place first as a team.  Individually she won gold in the all-around and bronze on balance beam.

Competitive history

References

External links 
 

2000 births
Living people
Chinese female artistic gymnasts
Gymnasts from Shanghai
Gymnasts at the 2018 Asian Games
Medalists at the 2018 Asian Games
Asian Games gold medalists for China
Asian Games bronze medalists for China
Asian Games medalists in gymnastics
Gymnasts at the 2020 Summer Olympics
Olympic gymnasts of China